Menikdiwela is a town in the western part of the Kandy District on the Central Province of Sri Lanka.

Geography and Demography 
The town is situated near the Kegalle District border. Kandy is the nearest city (around 20 km) from this town.

According to the Local governing body, the population of Menikdiwela as of 2008 is about 1,000.

Civil affair 
The town is famous for various agricultural products like rice. Menikdiwela is also the hometown of Sirasa Superstar first season second Runner-up Amila Perera and J. R. Jayawardane's official secretariat W. M. P. B. Menikdiwela. In the beginning, the town started with only seven houses and developed.

Kandy-Pottapitiya and Kandy-Hataraliyadda (Via Thismada) roads split in Menikdiwela Junction.

Menikdewela Central College is also located at Menikdiwela.

External links 

Populated places in Kandy District